Kirk Schuring (born September 17, 1952) is an American politician serving as a member of the Ohio Senate. He served as interim Speaker of the Ohio House of Representatives, following the resignation of Speaker Cliff Rosenberger. Rosenberger resigned amid revelations he was under investigation by the Federal Bureau of Investigation. He was previously a member of the Ohio House of Representatives from 1993 to 2002, and from 2011 to 2018. Schuring also previously served in the Ohio Senate from 2003 to 2010. He was the Republican nominee for Ohio's 16th congressional district in the 2008 election. In 2018, Schuring was re-elected to the Ohio Senate, where represents the 29th district.

Career
Schuring joined his family's insurance agency in 1978. He was president of the Canton Jaycees, the Young Republicans, and the Canton Urban League. He has also served as Chairman of the Stark/Wayne Christmas Seal Drive and the Chamber's Vision 1 Committee.

Ohio House of Representatives (1993–2002) 
In 1993, Schuring was appointed to an open seat in the Ohio House of Representatives vacated by Representative David Johnson. He was elected to his full first term in 1994, and re-elected in 1996, 1998 and 2000, before being term limited in 2002.

Ohio Senate (2003–2010) 
With both Schuring and Senator Scott Oelslager term limited from their respective positions in 2002, they swapped seats. Schuring won against Democrat Jan Schwartz with 55.6% of the vote in the general election. In the 126th General Assembly, Schuring served as Reference Committee Chairman.

In 2006, he defeated Democrat Thomas West again with 55% of the vote. He again served as Reference Committee Chairman for the 127th General Assembly.

2008 congressional campaign 
When Congressman Ralph Regula announced in late-2007 that he would not seek another term in Congress, Schuring won the Republican nomination to succeed him. His opponent was fellow state Senator John Boccieri, who had been elected to the Senate in 2006. While historically a Republican district, Boccieri won with 55.36% of the vote.

Ohio House of Representatives (2011–2019) 
Schuring again faced term limits in 2010 in the Senate, and Oelslager too could not run for another term. As a result, they again ran for each other's seats. The maneuver again proved successful, with Schuring defeating Democrat Andrew Haines with 69.2% of the vote in the general election.

Schuring was sworn in to begin his second tenure in the House on January 3, 2011. In 2012, Schuring won reelection with 57.34% over Democrat Amanda Trump.

Political positions
Schuring has worked to develop a pension reform plan that doesn't involve hikes to employer contribution to public retirement systems. There's a "sentiment of caution" among many lawmakers in terms of pension reform. He said many lawmakers are "justifiably sensitive to the plight of local governments." He has been critical to finding a solution in providing a cost efficient and solvent solution to the public pension systems.

The only Republican to vote against the measure, Schuring joined Democrats in voting against a measure to require a photo ID when casting a ballot in Ohio. Many had criticized Republicans for pushing the measure through the legislature.

See also 
United States House of Representatives elections in Ohio, 2008

References

External links 
The Ohio House of Representatives: Rep. Kirk Schuring (R-Canton) official site
Project Vote Smart – Senator J. Kirk Schuring (OH) profile
The Canton Repository Endorses Kirk Schuring
Follow the Money – Kirk Schuring
2006 2004 2002 HD-29 2002 HD-55 2000 1998 1996 campaign contributions

|-

|-

|-

1952 births
21st-century American politicians
Kent State University alumni
Living people
Republican Party members of the Ohio House of Representatives
Republican Party Ohio state senators
Politicians from Canton, Ohio